Anamenia is a genus of cavibelonian solenogaster, a kind of shell-less, worm-like mollusk.

Species
 Anamenia agassizi (Heath, 1918)
 Anamenia amabilis Saito & Salvini-Plawen, 2010
 Anamenia amboinensis (Thiele, 1902)
 Anamenia borealis (Koren & Danielssen, 1877)
 Anamenia farcimen (Heath, 1911)
 Anamenia gorgonophila (Kowalevsky, 1880)
 Anamenia spinosa (Heath, 1911)
 Anamenia triangularis (Heath, 1911)
Species brought into synonymy
 Anamenia heathi Leloup, 1947: synonym of Anamenia gorgonophila (Kowalevsky, 1880) (junior synonym)
 Anamenia nierstraszi (Stork, 1940): synonym of Anamenia gorgonophila (Kowalevsky, 1880)

References

 Nierstrasz, H. 1908. The Solenogastres of Discovery-Expedition. Nation. Antarctic Exped. 1901-1904, Natur. Hist., 4:38-46

External links
 Gofas, S.; Le Renard, J.; Bouchet, P. (2001). Mollusca. in: Costello, M.J. et al. (eds), European Register of Marine Species: a check-list of the marine species in Europe and a bibliography of guides to their identification. Patrimoines Naturels. 50: 180-213

Solenogastres